Shane Gilberto Jenek (born 18 February 1982), better known under the stage name Courtney Act, is an Australian drag queen, singer and television personality. Courtney first came to prominence competing on the first season of Australian Idol in 2003. After the show, she signed to BMG Australia (now Sony Music Australia), and she released her debut single, "Rub Me Wrong",  which peaked at No. 29 on the ARIA Singles Chart and eventually gained a gold certification. While auditioning for Australian Idol, she also became the first LGBTQ contestant to openly appear on a reality TV talent show. In 2014, Courtney was one of the runners-up in season six of RuPaul's Drag Race. 

In 2014, Courtney returned to recording music and released the extended play Kaleidoscope (2015), which included the title-track which was the official song for the 2016 Sydney Gay and Lesbian Mardi Gras. Courtney began performing in drag girl-group, The AAA Girls, released several singles and embarked on the North American, Access All Areas Tour (2015). In January 2018, Courtney appeared on season 21 of Celebrity Big Brother UK and ultimately won the series with 49.43% of the final public vote. She began branching into a hosting career, hosting The Bi Life, the UK's first bisexual reality dating show, on E! and her own television special, The Courtney Act Show. Courtney released "Fight for Love" in late 2018 for the Eurovision - Australia Decides final; she finished in fourth place.
In 2019, Courtney competed and was runner-up on season 16 of the Australian version of Dancing with the Stars, where she was paired with Joshua Keefe. This made Courtney and Keefe the first same-sex pairing in the history of the Australian version, as well as the second same-sex pairing on any version of the show. Courtney/Jenek uses the pronoun she when referring to Courtney and he when referring to Jenek. In 2022, it was announced that Act would be a judge on the ITV reality competition series, Queens for the Night.

Early life
Jenek was born in Brisbane, Australia, and moved to Sydney at age 18. He was born to Gill and Annette Jenek and he has an older sister named Kim. His mother is of Danish descent and his father is of German descent. Growing up, Jenek would always dress up and sing and dance. In 1987, he entered a competition, Tiny Tots, which was a charity pageant show for children. At a young age, Jenek began attending The Fame Talent School where he became close friends with twins Lisa Origliasso and Jessica Origliasso, who would later become The Veronicas. The group would perform together for twelve years. Jenek found school difficult due to bullying over his sexuality. He began to think something was wrong with him during his teenage years. Jenek received high grades at school and he was going to study medicine to become a doctor instead of an entertainer. He first attended the Stonewall Club in the mid-90s and Jenek states that was the start of his "big queer life". He originally intended to take the name Ginger Le'Bon and be a "redheaded, smoky voiced nightclub singer." Instead, he took the stage name Courtney Act, a pun on the phrase caught in the act as pronounced in a non-rhotic accent such as Australian English. When growing up, Jenek couldn't identify with anything that was portrayed in the media.

Career

Beginnings and Australian Idol
Jenek's drag queen career began in 2002 when he met Sydney drag queen, Vanity Faire. He was intrigued by the visual feminine illusion Faire would create once he was in drag and this inspired him to begin his drag career. He decided upon the stage name Courtney Act as, in a non-rhotic accent like the Australian accent, the phrase "caught in the act" is heard. Courtney has stated that in 2002, when she began performing in drag, one had to "fight" and "earn" one's place as a drag queen. She entered the Diva Rising Star competition in 2002 and won.

In 2003 Courtney auditioned for the inaugural season of Australian Idol. He first appeared as Jenek, but the judges, Ian Dickson, Marcia Hines and Mark Holden, told Jenek that his voice was "just not up to it". The following day, Jenek returned to audition but as Courtney Act. Hines said that Courtney was "great". Dickson said, "Shane only didn't just cut it. You've added another dimension and this time you've blown us away." Courtney continued through the competition and reached the live finals. In the first TV vote Courtney did not advance; however, the judges brought her back as a wildcard. During her time on the show she performed songs such as: "I Am Woman" by Helen Reddy, "You Don't Own Me" by Lesley Gore and “You Shook Me All Night Long" by AC/DC. Courtney finished in thirteenth place on the show, but remained highly popular throughout Australia. At the time, Jenek was the first and only LGBT contestant to openly appear on a reality TV talent show.

Together with business partner  and fellow drag queen Vanity Faire, Courtney operates Wigs by Vanity; they started the company in 2003, the year Courtney auditioned for idol, with the aim of producing wigs for drag queens.

Record deal and RuPaul's Drag Race
After the completion of the first season of Australian Idol, Courtney went on tour with the finalist of the show. It was in 2003, Courtney signed a major record deal with BMG Australia now known as Sony Music Australia. Courtney released her debut single "Rub Me Wrong" the following year in March 2004, where the song reached a peak of number 29 on the ARIA Charts and gaining a gold certification by the charts. However, due to the low charting figures of the song, BMG Australia decided to put Courtney's debut album on hold. Courtney returned to the club scene and began working with the up-and-coming Lady Gaga. In August 2011, Jenek moved to West Hollywood, California in order to find further success.

In December 2013, Logo TV announced that Courtney was among the 14 drag queens who would be competing on the sixth season of RuPaul's Drag Race. Courtney is the only queen from Australia ever to be featured on the show. Courtney did not feature in the first episode of season 6 due to the show being split into two openings. During the third episode, the week's challenge was to act in a horror movie, the original and the sequel. Courtney was ultimately given positive feedback and declared safe. Episode 4 featured Courtney as the main challenge winner. The main challenge was to perform in "Shade: The Rusical". Courtney was praised for her "strong" singing voice and acting skills. The fifth episode featured the Snatch Game, which is a spoof of The Match Game.

During the episode, the drag queens had to impersonate a celebrity. Courtney impersonated Fran Drescher and was ultimately declared safe. The following show, Courtney had to record a version of RuPaul's song, "Oh No She Betta Don't!" from his album: again, Courtney was declared safe. During the seventh episode, the queens had to create a commercial advertisement for RuPaul's new product, Glamazon by Colorevolution. Courtney worked in a team with Joslyn Fox. The pair got negative critiques from the judges, with Santino Rice saying the pair shouldn't rely on pretty and that they could have taken it "further". The next episode would see the queens being tested on their comedy: Courtney announced on the show she was nervous about the challenge because she does not see herself as a "comedy queen". Ultimately, Courtney was declared safe for the episode. In the ninth episode's challenge, the queens had to host their own talk show and interview celebrity guests: Cher's son Chaz Bono and his grandmother (Cher's mother), Georgia Holt. Courtney was praised by all the judges and through the show, Courtney and Bono made a friendship, which resulted in Bono inviting Courtney to perform in the musical he was producing. Courtney also won the ninth episode challenge. The tenth episode saw a makeover challenge, in which the queens had to make grooms-to-be into the bride. Courtney was declared safe. The following few episodes, Courtney was announced as safe and would proceed to the final in the top 3. Courtney was the fourth contestant during the show's six seasons not to have fallen into the bottom two throughout the competition. She placed as joint runner-up alongside Adore Delano, behind winner Bianca Del Rio.

Reality television and return to music
In July 2014, Courtney became the first drag performer in history to sing live with the San Francisco Symphony Orchestra. Courtney appeared as a guest performer with Cheyenne Jackson in "Hello, Gorgeous! Cheyenne Jackson Goes to the Movies". The two sang a duet of "Elephant Love Song" from the 2001 Baz Luhrmann film Moulin Rouge! In September 2014, Courtney, along with Willam Belli and Alaska Thunderfuck 5000, were the first drag queens to become ad girls for American Apparel, known as The AAA Girls, also becoming the first drag queens to feature in RuPaul's Drag Race to form a drag girl-group. She worked for the campaign Support Artists, Support Ethical Manufacturing from the fashion brand, featuring three limited edition exclusive T-shirts that honour each drag queen's talents and allure. The group released their debut single "American Apparel Ad Girls" in late 2014 a parody of "Farrah Fawcett Hair" by Capital Cities. The song charted at number 10 on the Billboard Comedy Digital songs chart: the song would later feature in Belli's solo album, Shartistry in Motion (2014). In December 2014 the group released a Christmas song, "Dear Santa, Bring Me a Man", which was featured in the first Christmas Queens (2015). The album also saw Courtney cover a solo version of "Twelve Days of Christmas". The AAA Girls recorded a second song featured on the compilation album, Christmas Sweater. Again in June 2015, the group reunited to record for Alaska's debut studio album Anus (2015), where they collaborated on the track "The Shade of It All".

In July 2015, Courtney returned to her solo recording career and created the extended play Kaleidoscope (2015). The album generally received positives from critics and it saw the release of lead single "Ecstasy". This was followed by "Ugly", "Body Parts" and the title track song "Kaleidoscope". The latter featured as the official song for the 2016 Sydney Gay and Lesbian Mardi Gras. Courtney stated: "I feel that gender and sexuality are fluid and so often we get stuck in the rigidity. Who knows when someone outside your usual target zone might come also and sweep you off your feet? I read this quote from Lily Edelstein the other day it is seemed fitting “At the heart of Queer culture is revolution. The truest rebellion against a world built on categories, labels and binaries is coming from the emergence of identities that refuse to conform.”. In 2016, Courtney was the foreign correspondent for the Australian news website, Junkee. Courtney covered the US Presidential election 2016 for the site, attending rallies of both Hillary Clinton and Donald Trump. Following Trump's election, Courtney also participated in, and reported on, the 2017 Women's March.

In late 2017, Courtney made a return to reality television and appeared in Single AF, with Marnie Simpson, which is a celebrity dating show, broadcast on MTV UK. In February 2018, Courtney was appointed one of two Fringe Ambassadors at the Adelaide Fringe, presenting the show Under the Covers there. In 2017, Courtney reunited with The AAA Girls for the Access All Areas Tour (2017). The tour was announced August 2017, a month after the release of their EP. Produced by Fullscreen Live, the tour played in 15 cities in the United States and Canada. The show was promoted as a full production with full staging, costume changes and choreography. As a thank you, the group live-called fans, on Instagram, who purchased tickets. The Squared Division served as creative directors and Jae Fusz served as choreographer.

In 2018, Courtney entered the Celebrity Big Brother house, the day after New Year's Day, and remained in the house for 32 days, eventually winning the season, beating Ann Widdecombe. Jenek appeared as both Courtney and himself throughout the season, being referred to "him" out of drag and "her" in drag. Following Courtney's win on Big Brother, her popularity continued to grow in the United Kingdom. Channel 4 confirmed The Courtney Act Show, with Courtney saying that she would be "working with some of [her] favourite artists", which was broadcast on Christmas Eve of 2018. The show featured performances from Bianca Del Rio, Adore Delano, Darienne Lake and Leona Lewis. Jenek also hosted the dating reality show The Bi Life, appearing both as Courtney Act and Shane, which premiered in Ireland and the United Kingdom on 25 October 2018 on E! Courtney competed with the song "Fight for Love" on Eurovision - Australia Decides in February 2019 to represent Australia in the Eurovision Song Contest 2019, but was not successful, losing out to Kate Miller-Heidke with the song "Zero Gravity". The show received positive reviews. In June 2019, a panel of judges from New York magazine placed her third on their list of "the most powerful drag queens in America", a ranking of 100 former Drag Race contestants.

Dancing with the Stars, Neighbours, Judging role and We Will Rock You The Arena Experience
In 2019, Courtney competed in the 16th season of the Australian version of Dancing with the Stars, partnered with Joshua Keefe, where they came second. Courtney is the first drag performer in the history of the Dancing with the Stars franchise, but not the first to perform in a same-sex pairing – fashion designer  and professional dancer  reached the grand final in the series of Ballando con le Stelle, the show's Italian counterpart. Keefe was visibly surprised when Jenek arrived for their first meeting, before realising that he is the alter-ego of Courtney. Jenek and Keefe dance as a same-sex pairing in the rehearsal footage for each week's performance and he has expressed a desire to perform as Jenek as well, according to Gay Star News. Courtney and Keefe topped the leader board with their performance in the first episode. On 1 March 2019, it was announced that Courtney had filmed a guest role as herself in the Australian soap opera Neighbours. Her scenes aired in 2020. In late 2019, Courtney featured in Celebrity Come Dine with Me. Courtney has appeared twice as a contestant on the quiz show Celebrity Mastermind; the British version in 2018, and the Australian version in 2020.

In 2021 it was announced that Courtney would become the new host of the Australian Broadcasting Corporation's long form television interview show Courtney Act's One Plus One, which was nominated for an AACTA Award. It was revealed that Network 10 had commissioned a pilot of Act's interview television series called Courtney's Closet, which transformed a different celebrity guest into drag each week while also learning about their personal journey, and premiered on video on demand streaming website 10 Play as part of its Pilot Showcase series. Act's podcast with Vanity Faire, also got renewed for a second season, Brenda! Call Me. The show was world's largest LGBTQIA+ podcast, with the first season reaching 750,000 listens across 170 countries worldwide since debuting in February last year. In June 2022, it was revealed that Act would become a judge on new ITV reality competition show, Queens for the Night, where she will sit on the judging panel alongside Melanie C, Layton Williams and Rob Beckett, with Lorraine Kelly as host.

On the 22nd of August 2022 It was announced that Courtney would play the Killer Queen in all cities except for Sydney in the Australian arena tour of the We Will Rock You (musical).

Personal life
Jenek is a vegan, and identifies as pansexual, genderfluid and polyamorous. In 2018, he was based in London, having previously lived in Sydney and Los Angeles.

Discography

Extended plays

Singles

As lead artist

As featured artist

Other appearances

Tours
Co-headlining tours
 Access All Areas Tour (2017)

Filmography

Film

Television

Web series

Music videos

Music video appearances

References

External links

 
 
 

1982 births
Living people
Australian expatriates in the United States
Australian drag queens
Australian Idol participants
Australian people of Danish descent
Australian people of German descent
Australian pop singers
Non-binary singers
Australian LGBT singers
Courtney Act
Big Brother (British TV series) contestants
Non-binary drag performers
Pansexual musicians
Polyamorous people
Reality show winners
Pansexual non-binary people
Genderfluid people